Yevgeny Ivanovich Kim  (27 February 1932 – 12 November 1998) was an intelligence officer in the KGB and the recipient of the title Hero of the Soviet Union.

Early life
Kim was born on 1932 in Gochang County to a Korean peasant family, in Korea under Japanese rule. His family later migrated to the Soviet Union. His name was Kim Yong Chue until 1978.

KGB career
In 1960 he graduated from the Faculty of Oriental Studies at the Leningrad State University with a degree in Japanese philology. Kim was fluent in Japanese, Korean, English and Spanish languages.

Kim served in the First Main Directorate of the KGB of the USSR from 1960. In 1966, as intelligence agent, he began to work in an unidentified country with a complex intelligence-operational situation. There he showed himself to be an expert intelligence agent, distinguished by high professionalism, broad outlook, good analytical and organizational skills. Working undercover until 1989, he successfully managed the autonomous illegal residency created with his direct participation and had contacts who were sources of valuable documentary information; through these contacts Kim obtained information on priority issues which were highly appreciated and implemented according to the highest priority. Currently, the identification of the country in which Kim worked remains classified. It is assumed that he worked in China, where other Soviet Koreans in KGB were assigned in those days, but this is unconfirmed.

Abroad, Kim managed to achieve a high post in the civil service and began to transmit valuable information to the USSR. A couple of times, the KGB arranged trips for Kim to meet with his wife and son, who remained in Moscow as the Slavic appearance of his wife could create risks during his assignment. But such trips were very rare. However, he later divorced from his wife following the death of his son from drowning. He returned home for one day, to prepare for his son's funeral.

By the decree of the Presidium of the Supreme Soviet of the USSR of December 21, 1987, Kim was awarded the high title of Hero of the Soviet Union with the Order of Lenin and the Gold Star medal for “courage and heroism displayed in the performance of his official duty”.

After his return to the USSR, Kim continued to work in the central apparatus of the KGB.

Later life

Following the dissolution of Soviet Union, after taking a temporary break, he worked in the newly created Foreign Intelligence Service of the Russian Federation.

Kim died in Moscow on November 12, 1998, after being hit by a car. He was buried with full military honors at the Troyekurovskoye Cemetery in Moscow.

Awards and decorations

Honorary State Security Officer

References

1932 births
1998 deaths
People from Gochang County
Koryo-saram
KGB officers
Heroes of the Soviet Union
Recipients of the Order of Lenin
Recipients of the Order of the Red Banner
Recipients of the Order of the Red Star
Recipients of the Medal "For Courage" (Russia)
Recipients of the Order "For Merit to the Fatherland", 4th class
Soviet people of Korean descent
Russian people of Korean descent
Linguists from Russia
Saint Petersburg State University alumni
Burials in Troyekurovskoye Cemetery
Road incident deaths in Russia